Bloomfield (released in the United States as The Hero) is a 1971 British-Israeli drama film directed by Richard Harris and Uri Zohar. It was entered into the 21st Berlin International Film Festival.

The soundtrack of the film composed and produced by Johnny Harris includes a short version of "The Loner", a song co-written by Maurice Gibb and Lulu's brother Billy Lawrie. Johnny Harris was MD for Lulu at the time this song was composed and recorded in 1969. It was released on a Pye Records single in 1972 performed by The Bloomfields when the film was finally released in Great Britain.  The soundtrack also includes 3 tracks by Heads Hands & Feet.

Production
The film was originally called Knights of Bloomfield and was to be directed by Uri Zohar. At one point the film was going to be shot in Italy and was known as Viva Higgins. Harris called the story "very autobiographical. It's a story about freedom and man's success and moments of failure." The film was financed by the Investor's Overseas Service, a mutual fund run by Bernie Cornfeld. It was their first investment in moviemaking although Cornfeld had invested in the short lived Commonwealth United Company.

Filming started in October 1969 in Israel, in Tel Aviv and Jaffa. Two weeks into filming director Uri Zohar left the production. After a week Harris took over as director. Since Harris was not a member of a technical union a crew union ordered its members to stop working but they continued anyway. "No other director would take over without months of preparation," claimed Harris.

Harris was meant to be in Israel for five weeks and ended up staying five months, causing him to miss out on playing the title role in the film Scrooge (Albert Finney took the role). After he made the film Harris said he felt like putting an ad in Variety apologizing to all the directors he had worked with. Cinematographer Otto Heller died two weeks after filming.

Location shooting took place around Tel Aviv, particularly at the Bloomfield Stadium. Interiors were shot at Twickenham Studios in London. The film's sets were designed by the art director Richard Macdonald.

Plot
A footballer in Israel is offered a bribe to lose a match. But when he meets a child who is a fan of his, the footballer decides to win the game.

Cast
 Richard Harris as Eitan
 Romy Schneider as Nira
 Kim Burfield as Nimrod
 Maurice Kaufmann as Yasha
 Yossi Yadin as Weiner
 Shraga Friedman as Chairman
 Aviva Marks as Teddy
 Yossi Graber as Bank manager
 David Heyman as Eldad

Reception
The film had its world premiere in Harris' hometown of Limerick. Screened at the 1971 Berlin Film Festival, Rex Reed who was a judge called it "an appalling piece of self indulgent garbage."

The film was not released in the US until 1972 where it was screened under the title The Hero.

References

External links
 

1971 films
1971 drama films
1971 multilingual films
1970s English-language films
1970s Hebrew-language films
1970s sports drama films
Films directed by Richard Harris
Films directed by Uri Zohar
Films set in Israel
Films shot at Twickenham Film Studios
British association football films
British sports drama films
British multilingual films
Israeli multilingual films
Films with screenplays by Wolf Mankowitz
Israeli sports drama films
1970s British films
English-language Israeli films